Yrjö Salpakari (born 25 September 1945) is a Finnish biathlete. He competed at the 1968 Winter Olympics and the 1972 Winter Olympics.

References

External links
 

1945 births
Living people
Finnish male biathletes
Olympic biathletes of Finland
Biathletes at the 1968 Winter Olympics
Biathletes at the 1972 Winter Olympics
People from Lapua
Sportspeople from South Ostrobothnia